The North Burnett Region is a local government area in Queensland, Australia in the northern catchment of the Burnett River. Established in 2008, it was preceded by several previous local government areas with histories extending back to the early 1900s.

It has an estimated operating budget of A$32  million.

History
Prior to the 2008 amalgamation, the North Burnett Region, located in the northern catchment of the Burnett River, existed as six distinct local government areas:

 the Shire of Biggenden;
 the Shire of Eidsvold;
 the Shire of Gayndah;
 the Shire of Monto;
 the Shire of Mundubbera;
 and the Shire of Perry.

The first local government in the North Burnett area was the Gayndah Municipality, which was created on 28 November 1866 under the Municipal Corporations Act 1864. On 11 November 1879, the Rawbelle and Perry Divisions were created to serve regional areas under the Divisional Boards Act 1879. A third division, Eidsvold, was proclaimed on 25 January 1890.

On 31 March 1903, following the enactment of the Local Authorities Act 1902, Gayndah became a town while the three divisions became shires. On 3 June 1905, the Shire of Degilbo, centred on Biggenden, was established from part of the Shire of Burrum. On 19 May 1915, the Shire of Auburn (later renamed Mundubbera) was separately incorporated. On 17 March 1923, the Shire of Rawbelle was renamed Gayndah and on 24 May 1924, it absorbed the Town. On 3 March 1932, the Shire of Monto came into being and Eidsvold was reincorporated. Finally, on 12 July 1941, Degilbo was renamed Biggenden.

In July 2007, the Local Government Reform Commission released its report and recommended that the six areas amalgamate, asserting that there were "inefficiencies with having six local governments to manage the economic and community interests of a relatively small geographic region which has a static population of just over 10,000". It believed amalgamation would offer potential for both strategic planning and improving the quality of governance and decision-making, as well as allowing one of the towns to emerge as a regional centre for the area. Queensland Treasury had rated all of the councils for financial sustainability, with all except Perry and Biggenden attracting a weak rating. Each of the councils apart from Gayndah opposed the Commission's model, with several suggesting either amalgamation with one or two other shires, or with local governments outside the region (in particular the Shire of Kolan and Gladstone/Calliope). In the end, its proposal was unchanged. On 15 March 2008, the Shires formally ceased to exist, and elections were held on the same day to elect councillors and a mayor to the Regional Council.

Wards and councillors
The Region is divided into six divisions, each electing one councillor, with a mayor elected by the entire Region. Joy Jensen, the mayor for the Shire of Perry, was elected at the March 2008 local government elections but was not re-elected in 2012.

Mayors 

 2008–2012: Joy Jensen 
 2012–2016: Don Waugh 
 2016–2021: Rachel Louise Chambers

Towns and localities
The North Burnett Region includes the following settlements:

Biggenden area:
 Biggenden
 Coalstoun Lakes
 Dallarnil
 Degilbo
 Didcot
Eidsvold area:
 Abercorn
 Ceratodus
 Eidsvold
 Wuruma Dam
Gayndah area:
 Ban Ban Springs
 Binjour
 Byrnestown
 Gayndah
 Gooroolba
 Ideraway
 Wetheron

Monto area:
 Bancroft
 Bukali
 Cannia
 Cannindah
 Coominglah
 Coominglah Forest
 Glenleigh
 Harrami
 Kalpowar
 Kapaldo
 Langley
 Monal
 Monto
 Moonford
 Mulgildie
 Mungungo
 Rawbelle
 Selene
 Splinter Creek
 Tellebang
 Three Moon
 Ventnor

Mundubbera area:
 Boynewood
 Dykehead
 Gurgeena
 Monogorilby
 Mundubbera
 Philpott
 Riverleigh
Perry area:
 Mount Perry

Other areas:
 Aranbanga
 Ban Ban
 Barlyne
 Beeron
 Blairmore
 Bon Accord
 Branch Creek
 Brovinia
 Campbell Creek
 Cattle Creek
 Cheltham
 Coonambula
 Coringa
 Cynthia
 Deep Creek
 Derri Derra
 Dirnbir

 Dundarrah
 Eidsvold East
 Eidsvold West
 Ginoondan
 Glenrae
 Golden Fleece
 Good Night
 Grosvenor
 Harriet
 Hawkwood
 Humphery
 Lakeside
 Malmoe
 Mingo, Queensland
 Mount Debateable
 Mount Lawless
 Mount Steadman

 Mundowran
 Mungy
 O'Bil Bil
 Old Cooranga
 Penwhaupell
 Pile Gully
 Reids Creek
 Stockhaven
 The Limits
 Toondahra
 Wahoon
 Wateranga
 Wilson Valley
 Woodmillar
 Woowoonga
 Yarrol
 Yenda

Libraries 
The North Burnett Regional Council operates public libraries at Biggenden, Eidsvold, Gayndah, Monto, Mount Perry, and Mundubbera.

Planning scheme 
The North Burnett Regional Council's first planning scheme commenced on 3 November 2014. It replaced the six planning schemes prepared by the former Councils. As a scheme that follows the State-mandated structure it contains the following key components: a Strategic framework (Part 3), Priority infrastructure plan (Part 4), Tables of assessment (Part 5), Zones (Part 6), Overlays (Part 8), Other codes (Part 9), Definitions (Schedule 1), Mapping (Schedules 2 and 3) and Planning scheme policies (Schedule 6).

Planning scheme mapping is accessible via the Council's online interactive mapping.

Heritage
On 5 May 2014, the North Burnett Regional Council published their first Local Heritage Register, containing 64 sites out of a proposed 71.

Population

References

External links

Report of the Local Government Reform Commission Volume 1 July 2007 (Queensland Parliament) Retrieved 3 Nov 2018
  Interactive Map of North Burnett Region (from Electoral Commission Queensland website) Retrieved 17 April 2008 
 Library Services

 
Local government areas of Queensland
2008 establishments in Australia